Scorpio is a fictional DC Comics terrorist organization introduced in 1965's Challengers of the Unknown issue #47.

Fictional team history
A mercenary group of terrorists-for-hire. Scorpio is a well-equipped organization always on the look out for advanced technology that can easily be weaponized.

Challengers
They were first seen in public fighting off both the Sea Devils and the Challengers of the Unknown, in order to gain control over a living weapon of mass destruction known as the Sponge Man. A field leader known as Agent Number Eight was responsible for duping the Sponge Man into attacking both the Sea Devils and the Challengers of the Unknown. The Sponge Man had the ability to absorb water, and also any kind of energy: kinetic, heat, light, color, or sound. The more he absorbed the larger he grew, seemingly without limits.

Thunderbolt

Scorpio returns in Peter Cannon, Thunderbolt #2-12. It is discovered that an escalation in the conflicts between London's smaller crime families is largely due to the influence of international crime and terror cartel Scorpio. Thunderbolt confronts his lover Cairo DeFrey, with the knowledge that he knows she is indeed the head of Scorpio; he does not arrest her but he does end their relationship.

Skyrocket
Most recently, Scorpio shows up again in Power Company: Skyrocket #1 (set between the Challengers and Thunderbolt stories), where they kill the parents of Celia Forrestal. Celia becomes the heroine Skyrocket in order to avenge their deaths. Skyrocket and Green Lantern Hal Jordan captured several Scorpio members, but their field leader, a woman called Scorpia, escaped.

On the cover to Skyrocket #1 Scorpio agents can be seen riding specialized scorpion shaped flying vehicles called Sky-Stingers.

Leadership roles
All of the important leadership roles within Scorpio after Cairo Defrey's re-organization of its command structure appear to be held by women. Whether this is tradition or coincidence is not known at this time.

Members
 
Low level Scorpio agents are apparently ranked by number and not name, the lower the number it seems, the lower the rank.
Cairo De Frey - Cairo was a top fashion model who took control of De Frey Endeavors and Scorpio when her father died. She is the current organizational leader of Scorpio, referred to as Number One by her operatives. At the time of the Thunderbolt storylines she appeared to be re-organizing Scorpio. She made her animated debut in Young Justice: Outsiders as a member of Intergang.
Claude De Frey - Father of Cairo De Frey, the original Number One, he oversaw the Sponge Man operation. Claude died recently.
Agents Number Two, and Three - Two high-ranking officers last seen during the Sponge Man operation.
Scorpia - A female field leader of Scorpio, during the Sponge Man operation she identified herself by rank number as Agent Number Eight. She made her animated debut in Young Justice: Outsiders as a member of Intergang. She is also related to Whisper A'Daire in this version.

Other DCU criminal organizations

References

External links
DCU Guide entry for Skyrocket
Scorpio entry at DCU Guide
Thunderbolt Chronology at DCU Guide
Sponge Man entry on DCU Guide

Comic book terrorist organizations
DC Comics supervillain teams
Scorpions in popular culture